Joseph Christian may refer to:

Joseph Christian (judge) (1828–1905), State senate and supreme court justice from Virginia
Joseph Christian Freiherr von Zedlitz (1790–1862), Austrian dramatist and epic poet
Joseph Christian Lillie (1760–1827), Danish neoclassical architect and interior designer
Johann Joseph Christian (1706–1777), German Baroque sculptor and woodcarver
J. C. Leyendecker (Joseph Christian Leyendecker, 1874–1951), American illustrator
Joseph-Christian-Ernest Bourret (1827–1896), French churchman, bishop and cardinal